NGC 163 is an elliptical galaxy in the constellation Cetus. It was discovered by William Herschel in 1890. Seen through an optical telescope it ranges up to 13th magnitude.

Notes

References

External links
 

Cetus (constellation)
Elliptical galaxies
0163
002149